Montenegrins in North Macedonia may refer to:

 Montenegrins of North Macedonia, an ethnic minority in North Macedonia
 Citizens of Montenegro, living or working in North Macedonia

See also
 Montenegro-North Macedonia relations
 Montenegrins (disambiguation)
 Montenegro (disambiguation)
 North Macedonia